Zarubin (Russian: Зарубин) is a Russian masculine surname originating from the noun zarub meaning a notch in a tree; its feminine counterpart is Zarubina. The surname may refer to the following notable people:
Elizabeth Zarubina (1900–1987), Soviet spy, wife of Vasily
Georgy Zarubin (1900–1958), Soviet diplomat
Irina Zarubina (1907–1976), Soviet theater and film actress
 Ivan Zarubin (1887–1964), Russian linguist
 Nikolai Zarubin (1948–1998), artist
 Roman Zarubin (born 1976), canoe racer
Ruslan Zarubin (born 1983), Ukrainian football player
 Vasily Zarubin (1894–1972), Soviet intelligence officer
 Viktor Ivanovich Zarubin (1866–1928), Russian painter

References

Russian-language surnames